The Ancient and Mystical Order Rosæ Crucis (AMORC), also known as the Rosicrucian Order, is the largest Rosicrucian organization in the world. It has various lodges, chapters and other affiliated bodies throughout the globe, operating in 19 different languages. It operates as a fraternal order in the mystical tradition, and supports secular research and learning in the arts and humanities.

AMORC claims an association with a "perennial philosophy", often referred to as "The Primordial Tradition". The Order further states that it is heir and custodian of the "Rose-Croix" of the past, thereby making it the oldest existing Traditional Fraternity and a modern-day manifestation of the 'Rosicrucian Fraternity' of old, which is believed by some to have originated in the traditions of the Ancient Egyptian Mystery schools. The ancient Mysteries are said to have been preserved through the millennia by closed secret societies until the early years of 17th Century Europe. At that point, according to AMORC internal mythology, the time was right for the existence of this body of secret knowledge to become open, i.e. revealed, to the world, in the form of the Rosicrucian manifestos.

Famous seventeenth century Rosicrucian Michael Maier described the origins of Rosicrucianism as "Egyptian, Brahmanic, derived from the Mysteries of Eleusis and Samothrace, the Magi of Persia, the Pythagoreans, and the Arabs." Several of his other works also allude to the mysterious origins of the Rosicrucians.

Today, AMORC is regarded as representing an "open cycle" of the ancient Rosicrucian tradition, its existence being a "reactivation" of Rosicrucian teaching in the United States, with previous Rosicrucian colonies in the United States having become dormant.

AMORC presents itself as a worldwide philosophical and humanistic, non-sectarian and apolitical fraternal order devoted to "the study of the elusive mysteries of life and the universe." It is also open to both men and women of legal adult age (18 years old in most countries) regardless of their various religious persuasions.

Name 
The name AMORC is an abbreviation of the Latin title Antiquus Mysticusque Ordo Rosæ Crucis ("Ancient and Mystic Order of the Rosy Cross" – "Antiquus Arcanus Ordo Rosae Rubeae et Aureae Crucis"). Harvey Spencer Lewis, author and mystic who re-activated AMORC in the United States of America, wrote that "from the very start, and with the issuance of the first public manifesto, the correct name of the international Rosicrucian organization was used, namely, the Ancient and Mystical Order Rosae Crucis. This is a slightly abbreviated form of the original Latin name, Antiquus Arcanus Ordo Rosae Rubeae et Aureae Crucis, and the initials AMORC were immediately used, as well as the true and original symbol of the Rosicrucian Order – the golden cross with but one red rose in the center". AMORC claims to hold legal rights to the above-mentioned titles including the title "Rosicrucian Order”.

Teachings
AMORC's teachings cover what may be termed the "Sacred Sciences" and include ideas based on the major philosophers, particularly Pythagoras, Thales, Solon, Heraclitus, and Democritus. The teachings are divided into "Degrees" which are further grouped into broad categories under titles such as  Postulant, Neophyte, and Initiate sections. These degrees cover various fields related to physical, mental, psychic, and spiritual existence such as physics, metaphysics, biology, psychology, parapsychology, comparative religion, traditional healing techniques, health, intuition, extrasensory perception, material and spiritual alchemy, meditation, sacred architecture, symbolism, and that mystical state of consciousness relating to the experience of unity with the Divine.

Organization and structure
AMORC is a worldwide organization, established in the United States as a nonprofit 501(c)(3) public benefit corporation, with the specific and primary purpose of advancing the knowledge of its history, principles, and teachings for charitable, educational, and scientific purposes. It is financed mainly through fees paid by its members. Income is used by the organization to pay expenses, develop new programs, expand services, and carry out educational work.

AMORC is governed by the Supreme Grand Lodge of AMORC which is composed of the Imperator, and the Board of Directors which is further composed of the Grand Masters of the Grand Lodges and related executive officers, and meets annually, often in Lachute, Quebec, Canada (however, in August 2009 the Supreme Board met in Toulouse, France, in honor of the 100th Anniversary of H. Spencer Lewis's initiation there) and more recently in Rome, Italy. It is responsible for the worldwide coordination of AMORC, the establishment of new administrations, and the appointment of jurisdictions to Grand Lodges, usually based on language.

Each AMORC Grand Lodge has its own headquarters and facilities. The headquarters of the English Grand Lodge for the Americas owns the Rosicrucian Park in San Jose, California, founded in 1927, which includes the Rosicrucian Egyptian Museum, the fifth planetarium built in the USA (and the first to have a US-built star projector, built by Dr. Harvey Spencer Lewis), the Rosicrucian Peace Garden, Rosicrucian Research Library, Grand Temple, Administration Building, Fountain Plaza and Gardens, the Alchemy Garden and the walking Labyrinth.

History

According to AMORC's internal history, in 1909 Harvey Spencer Lewis visited France in search of Rosicrucians, was initiated in Toulouse, France, and given the mandate to establish an order in North America. After further qualification and preparation, the first official Manifesto was issued in the United States in 1915, announcing the establishment of Rosicrucian activity in America. May Banks-Stacy, the co-founder of AMORC, was said to be one of the last successors to the original colony of Rosicrucians who settled in America during the late 17th century, and an initiate of the Rosicrucians of the East. Lewis became a "secret partner" of Big Business in America. According to railroad magnate Arthur Stilwell, no other man has exerted a greater influence as a secret partner in American free enterprise than Lewis. Walt Disney was once a member of AMORC as was Star Trek creator Gene Roddenberry and many other well-known individuals who prefer to remain anonymous.

AMORC headquarters were located in New York City, San Francisco, and Tampa, Florida, before moving to San Jose, California, in 1927. Harvey Spencer Lewis died in 1939 and, in accordance with wishes stipulated in his will, was succeeded in the Office of Imperator by his son Ralph Maxwell Lewis, who had previously served as Supreme Secretary. Upon Lewis' death in 1987, Gary L. Stewart, who previously served as Grand Master of the English-Speaking jurisdiction and then Vice President of AMORC's Board of Directors, was appointed by the Board, which forms the Supreme Grand Lodge, to the Office of Imperator. In 1990, Christian Bernard, who had been the Grand Master of France, and then succeeded Stewart to the position of Vice President of the Board, was elected by the Board to the Office of Imperator.

During World War II, AMORC underwent a dramatic period of growth. After the war ended AMORC was able to lend support to its European sister organizations. Eventually many of those came under the administration of AMORC's leadership in San Jose. 2009, the centennial year of H. Spencer Lewis's initiation in Toulouse, saw growth in membership in the English Grand Lodge for the Americas and very active participation in on-line activities including Facebook, Twitter, online discussion groups, a social networking site, podcasts and Rosicrucian TV on YouTube. Rosicrucian Park in San Jose received many improvements as well, including the completion of accessibility upgrades to the museum, planetarium and grounds, and the installation of sustainable native plant gardens.

AMORC uses "traditional" history, consisting of tales and legends represented as having been passed down for centuries by word of mouth, as well as the conventional "chronological" history, which consists of verifiable fact. According to its traditional history, AMORC traces its origin to Mystery Schools established in Egypt during the joint reign of Pharaoh Thutmose III and Hatshepsut, about 1500 BCE. They united the priesthoods of Egypt into a single order under the leadership of Hatshepsut's Vizier, Hapuseneb. Each Temple had its associated Per Ankh (House of Life) where the Mysteries were handed down. In uniting the priesthoods, the Per Ankhu were also united. Those schools were formed to probe into "the mysteries of life" – in other words, natural phenomena, and initiatic spirituality. AMORC also claims that among their most esteemed pupils were Pharaoh Akhenaten (Amenhotep IV) and his wife Nefertiti.

Over centuries, the Mystery Schools spread into Greece and thence into Rome. During the Middle Ages, they were allegedly concealed under various names. AMORC claims that Rosicrucianism is mentioned as far back as 1115 CE in a book of the collection of Brother Omnis Moriar in Germany. However, no other record of such a brother or book has appeared. The alleged name probably derives from the opening words of Horace in Ode 3.30, in which he writes: "Non Omnis Moriar" ("I shall not completely die").

Rosicrucianism rose to considerable prominence in Europe during the 17th century following the publication and wide circulation of a small pamphlet, the Fama Fraternitatis. AMORC scholars have suggested that Rosicrucians first went to America in the area of present-day Carmel-by-the-Sea, California in the Vizcaíno Expedition of 1602–1603. The next Rosicrucian expedition to America is said to have been by the chartered vessel Sarah Maria during the early months of 1694, under the leadership of Grand Master Johannes Kelpius, and a colony was established in what is now Fairmount Park, Philadelphia. They finally settled on the banks of the Wissahickon. "In that retired valley beside the flowing brook the secret rites and mysteries of the true Rosicrucian Philosophy flourished unmolested for years, until the state of affairs brought about by the American Revolution, together with pernicious Sunday legislation which also discriminated against the keepers of the scriptural Sabbath day, gradually caused the incoming generation to assimilate with the secular congregations." That is disputed by another organization, the Fraternity of the Rosy Cross, at one time headed by Dr. R. Swinburne Clymer. Johannes Kelpius, of the Jacob Boehme Lodge in Germany, allegedly led the German Pietists to America, although no historical evidence exists to support that claim, nor the common claim to be connected to the Ephrata Cloister. The two rival organizations have long disputed each other's claims to Rosicrucian genuineness.

Leadership and new groups
From 1915 to 1990, the leadership of AMORC was entrusted to the Office of an Imperator, who was solely responsible for all doctrine and ritual of the Order, as well as a corporate president who sat at the head of the board of directors, which was responsible for determining all corporate matters related to the organization. When AMORC reorganized in April, 1990, the dual function of the Office was merged into one position, that of President of the worldwide AMORC organization. However, the President is still referred to by the traditional title of Imperator. In addition to the Imperator, each Grand Lodge has a Grand Master.

In 1990, there was a dispute over the leadership of the AMORC, which was then under the leadership of Imperator Gary L. Stewart. It was prompted by allegations made by members of the Board of Directors of embezzlement on the part of Stewart. In April, 1990, a lawsuit was filed by the Board and, as a result of the allegations, a Temporary Restraining Order kept Stewart from returning to AMORC's properties until the trial. The newly expanded Board of Directors voted that the Vice President of the Board of Directors, Christian Bernard, should assume Stewart's offices. An installation ritual was held at the Fairmont Hotel in San Francisco, California. During the next three years there was little progress regarding the lawsuit. Eventually, the new AMORC Board of Directors sought to settle out of court, due to the ongoing financial strain of legal costs. On 10 August 1993, AMORC dismissed their case against Stewart with prejudice. The dismissal was the final severing of the relationship between Stewart and AMORC.

After his removal from AMORC in 1990, former Imperator Stewart founded the Confraternity of the Rose Cross, and used the original version of H. Spencer Lewis' monographs, with addenda added by Stewart, as well as additional monographs written by Stewart (as opposed to the monographs currently used by AMORC, which were initially rewritten in large parts under Imperator Bernard's supervision, and are now regularly revised and updated, according to AMORC traditional custom dating from the time of H. Spencer Lewis's first published materials in 1916). Stewart also founded the Order Militia Crucifera Evangelica and assisted with the formation of the British Martinist Order. Other organizations using the name Rosicrucian which formed after Stewart's removal from AMORC include the Ghanaian Order of the Rose Cross led by Benjamin Quaye, and the Norwegian Order of the Rose Cross led by Robert Aarberg, which are closely allied with Stewart's Confraternity of the Rose Cross, and the short-lived Ancient Rosae Crucis, which was led by Ashley McFadden.

Public activities

Many of the activities of the Rosicrucian Order AMORC are open to the public, as well as members. These include:

 Online Classes: In the fall of 2006, the English Grand Lodge for the Americas began offering free online classes in many subjects. Most of these Rose+Croix University Online Classes are open to both AMORC members and the public. These are conducted today on Facebook.
 Open Classes: These are held in many locations, including in North America and the Caribbean, and are listed on the AMORC English Grand Lodge for the Americas site in the external links below. Other such public activities can be found on the international sites.
 Meditation for Peace: In 2004, Imperator Christian Bernard proclaimed the annual Rosicrucian Meditation for Peace Ceremony at the Rosicrucian World Peace Conference (see below). This is held at the Grand Lodge and in affiliated bodies throughout the world on the fourth Sunday of June each year. North American and Caribbean locations are listed on the AMORC English Grand Lodge for the Americas site.
 Autumn Equinox Memorial Ceremony: The annual Memorial Ceremony is held at the Grand Lodge in San Jose and in affiliated bodies throughout the world at the Autumn Equinox each year. North American and Caribbean locations are listed on the AMORC English Grand Lodge for the Americas site.
 Council of Solace Ritual: The Imperator and Supreme Board of AMORC recently opened the Council of Solace Ritual, welcoming both members and the public to participate. In North America and the Caribbean, this meditation ceremony is held at the Grand Lodge headquarters in San Jose, and in most Grand Lodges worldwide.

AMORC often organizes various conferences around the world, increasingly having many sessions open to the public, and several councils of experts on various topics. In August 2001 the world convention took place in Gothenburg, Sweden. The main theme of the convention was world peace and harmony. The convention was of significant importance to Rosicrucian history because Imperator Bernard presented the "Positio Fraternitatis Rosæ Crucis" to inform the public about AMORC's position on the current world situation. A subsequent manifesto, the "Appellatio Fraternitatis Rosæ Crucis"was issued in 2014 as a call to action on these themes.

In July 2004 The Rosicrucian World Peace Conference was held in San Jose. Over 2000 Rosicrucians from 70 countries gathered with Imperator Christian Bernard, and North American Grand Master Julie Scott. The Imperator dedicated the Rosicrucian Park's Rosicrucian Peace Garden, designed according to examples from Egypt's 18th Dynasty by Grand Master Emeritus of the English Grand Lodge for Australia, New Zealand and Asia, Peter Bindon.

The World Convention for 2007 was held in Berlin, Germany with the theme "Love Will Build the Bridge." All of the events, except for the ritualistic convocations, were open to the public.

Curitiba, Brazil, the headquarters of the Portuguese Grand Lodge of AMORC, hosted the August 2011 World Convention: The Sacred and the Primordial Tradition.

The World Convention in 2015 was again held in San Jose CA USA celebrating the 100th Anniversary of AMORC's founding in America in 1915.

During the latest World Convention, held in Rome, Italy, in August 2019, a new Imperator was elected, namely the Italian Grand Master Claudio Mazzucco.

The International Research Council is a group of AMORC members who have expertise in several areas, including physics, biology, philosophy and music. According to the AMORC, the members of the International Research Council dedicate themselves to the advancement of their profession for the benefit of humanity.

The Rosicrucian Egyptian Museum launched a substantial new exhibit on Spiritual and Physical Alchemy on the Spring Equinox 2015.

The Rosicrucian Order hosted an academic conference for Scholars and Practitioners of Esotericism at Rosicrucian Park, 22–25 July 2010. The theme for the papers and presentations given by members of many different esoteric groups was the influence of esoteric Orders on the modern world. Several of the papers were to be published in the June 2011 Rose Croix Journal.

The Council of Solace is a group of Rosicrucians who meditate and direct spiritual force for health and harmony daily on behalf of others. They offer free, 24-hour metaphysical aid to those in need, regardless of membership. Members and the public may by invitation take part in the Council of Solace meditation ritual held in various locations.

The AMORC publishes several publications including a public magazine called the Rosicrucian Digest, an online academic periodical called the Rose-Croix Journal,  as well as books which focus on topics such as metaphysics, mysticism, and Egyptology.

Rosicrucian Digest

The Rosicrucian Digest was first published in 1915 under the name American Rosae Crucis, and then The Triangle, The Mystic Triangle and finally the Rosicrucian Digest. It has been adapted to serve the needs of each period. Beginning with the December 2006 issue (Vol 84:2) the Digest began a series of multimedia thematic issues available online and in print twice a year. The first such issue (December 2006) dealt with Atlantis, while the 2007 volumes covered Ancient Egypt and The Essenes. 2008 issues followed with The Orphic Mysteries and the Delphi, while 2009 issues covered the Pythagoreans and the Eleusinian Mysteries and other Timeline topics through 2014.

In the United Kingdom the public magazine is named Rosicrucian Beacon and is published quarterly by the "English speaking jurisdiction for Europe, Africa and the Middle East of the Rosicrucian Order AMORC." In Australasia the magazine is titled The Rosicrucian. Other AMORC jurisdictions have similar publications.

Rose+Croix Journal

AMORC's Rose+Croix Journal is "an international, interdisciplinary, transdisciplinary, peer-reviewed online journal that focuses on topics that relate to the sciences, history, the arts, mysticism, and spirituality, especially interdisciplinary topics and transdisciplinary inquiries that traverse and lie beyond the limits of different fields of study. These topics may relate to any of the arts and sciences and/or to other emerging fields of human endeavor." The journal's website also has a Resources section with the five Rosicrucian Manifestos, Secret Symbols of the Rosicrucians, Rosicrucian Documents, online editions of the Rosicrucian Digest, etc. Submissions are solicited from members and the public.

Multimedia and web presence
According to AMORC tradition, H. Spencer Lewis received the mandate from the Rosicrucians of Toulouse when he was initiated in 1909 to make the tradition available and comprehensible to modern women and men. In accord with this, H. Spencer Lewis, and after him Ralph M. Lewis, used all of the technologies available to them to accomplish their work. An example was the radio station H. Spencer Lewis had broadcasting from his office at the Rosicrucian Park, and before that, at the previous headquarters in Tampa, and San Francisco. The broadcasting from San Jose began on 15 February 1928 and was delivered by two 30-metre radio towers inside the park. The radio towers have since been removed, though for some time AMORC continued to broadcast through the historic San Jose KEEN radio station. Today, the Order communicates using newer media:

 Websites for all of the international jurisdictions of AMORC now provide instant access to information and resources for members and the public.
 The English Grand Lodge for the Americas began a series of public podcasts in 2006 and launched Rosicrucian TV on YouTube in 2009. Topics range include mysticism, Egyptology, peace, esotericism and other subjects.
 English Grand Lodge for the Americas members enjoy a private community social networking forum based in the Ning system.
 Facebook has rapidly become a major forum for North American AMORC, with over 300,000 likes for its main Facebook page as of October 2013. There are also fan pages for Rosicrucian Park, the Rosicrucian Egyptian Museum, Rose+Croix University Online Classes (including discussions of each issue of the new Rosicrucian Digests), the new Alchemy Exhibit at the Museum, and the Hidden in Plain Sight Conference.
 Twitter followers receive frequent updates from the Order, the Rosicrucian Egyptian Museum and the Rosicrucian Research Library.

The public presence of the Rosicrucians in Western Europe was made known through the publication of three manifestos. AMORC introduced a fourth manifesto, the Positio Fraternitatis Rosæ Crucis at an AMORC convention in Sweden in August 2001. The Positio offers AMORC's observations on problems in the modern world, along with proposed solutions. The Positio closes with an invocation that expresses what it calls "Rosicrucian Utopia": A subsequent manifesto, the "Appellatio Fraternitatis Rosæ Crucis", was issued in 2014 as a call to action on these themes. 
God of all beings, God of all life, In the humanity we are dreaming of:

 Politicians are profoundly humanistic and strive to serve the common good;
 Economists manage state finances with discernment and in the interest of all;
 Scientists are spiritualistic and seek their inspiration in the Book of Nature;
 Artists are inspired and express the beauty and purity of the Divine Plan in their works;
 Physicians are motivated by love for their fellow-beings and treat both the soul and the body;
 Misery and poverty have vanished, for everyone has what one needs to live happily;
 Work is not regarded as a chore; it is looked at as a source of growth and well-being;
 Nature is considered to be the most beautiful temple of all, and animals are considered to be our brothers and sisters on the path of evolution;
 A World Government composed of the leaders of all nations, working in the interest of all humanity, has come into existence.
 Spirituality is an ideal and a way of life, which springs forth from a Universal Religion, founded more upon the knowledge of divine laws than upon the belief in God;
 Human relations are founded upon love, friendship, and community, so that the whole world lives in peace and harmony.

Honors

Frater Rosae Crucis 
AMORC awards the titles Frater Rosae Crucis and Soror Rosae Crucis to members initiated into the 10th Degree of the order. These members are considered to have attained a master level of understanding of the society's teachings. Awardees may use the post-nominal letters F.R.C. or S.R.C. Julie Scott holds the title of S.R.C.

See also
 FUDOSI, federation of esoteric orders
 FUDOFSI
 Martinism (traditional Martinist Order)
 Rosicrucian Egyptian Museum
 Theosophy

Non-AMORC Rosicrucian groups
 Fraternitas Rosae Crucis
 Order of the Temple of the Rosy Cross
 The Rosicrucian Fellowship
 Societas Rosicruciana

References

Notes
 Raymond Bernard – Questions and Answers , (2006). Mysteries of the Tradition. Retrieved on 14 February 2006.
 Mastery of Life, (2006). Rosicrucian Order, AMORC. Retrieved on 22 February 2006.

External links
 
 Rose+Croix Journal
 A.M.O.R.C. Italy

Rosicrucian organizations
Organizations established in 1915
New religious movements
Organizations based in San Jose, California
Charities based in California
Religious charities based in the United States
Secret societies